Humans are a Canadian indie electronic pop duo.

History 
Vancouver's Robbie Slade and Peter Ricq met in 2008, and started making music together in the summer of 2009. They released a demo album in 2009. In 2010, the duo released their first EP called Avec Mes Mecs, and produced a video for its title track. Promotion through BIRP (an indie music blog & monthly playlist) along with fan-made videos ushered in the release of the official video in 2011.

Following up Avec Mes Mecs, the duo released their sophomore EP called Traps in 2012. The release received high praise from publications such as DJ Mag, Exclaim!, and Resident Advisor. A video for the song "Horizon" was premiered on Spinner.

Techniques, technology, live performances 

Humans have garnered a reputation for being a live act that is "full of unbelievable energy and ready to engage with the crowd." Their visual presentation uses live audio input from their shows, allowing for improvisation in both their visual and audio performances.

On tour, Humans have opened for Broken Social Scene, The Crystal Method, Junior Boys, and Clipse.

Discography

Albums

Extended plays

Singles
"The End" (2011)

Remixes
Yes Nice - "Horses" (2012)
The Belle Game - "Wasted Light" (2012)

References

External links
 Humans - Bandcamp page
  Humans - SoundCloud
 

Canadian electronic music groups
Musical groups from Vancouver